Thompson's Mills State Heritage Site is a state park near Shedd in Linn County, Oregon, United States, administered by the Oregon Parks and Recreation Department. The mill was first built in 1858. It burned down in 1862, but was rebuilt right away and the 12 inch by 12 inch hand hewn beams cut and placed while Lincoln was in office are still visible inside the mill today. A series owners adapted the mill to changing times turning the flour mill to a feed mill and eventually a hydroelectric plant operating until 2004, making it one of Oregon's oldest continuously operating water-powered businesses. Oregon State Parks purchased the property in 2004 and the park was opened to the public in December, 2007. The property was acquired and restored under governor Kulongoski's "park-a-year" plan, in which one new state park is to be opened every year. Free guided tours are offered daily allowing visitors to see the water powered turbines and machinery in action. The grounds are being restored to the 1910-1930s era with the heirloom orchard, gardens and plantings restored as well as heritage poultry roaming the grounds and original fence lines and paths; all will be open to the public when complete.

See also
 Boston Flour Mill
 Boston Mill Society
 List of Oregon state parks

References

External links
 

State parks of Oregon
Parks in Linn County, Oregon
Mill museums in the United States
Museums in Linn County, Oregon
Industry museums in Oregon
2007 establishments in Oregon